Igor Zubeldia Elorza (born 30 March 1997) is a Spanish professional footballer who plays for Real Sociedad as a defensive midfielder.

Club career
Born in Azkoitia, Gipuzkoa, Basque Country, Zubeldia joined Real Sociedad's youth setup in 2008, at the age of 11. On 6 June 2015, he promoted to the reserve team in Segunda División B.

Zubeldia made his senior debut on 29 August 2015, coming on as a second-half substitute in a 1–0 away loss against CD Ebro. On 25 February of the following year, he renewed his contract with Sanse until 2021.

Zubeldia made his first team – and La Liga – debut on 13 May 2016, replacing fellow youth graduate Rubén Pardo in the dying minutes of a 1–0 away win over Valencia CF. Ahead of the 2017–18 season, he was definitely promoted to the main squad.

On 20 December 2017, after just 30 seconds on the pitch, Zubeldia scored his first goal in the Spanish top flight to put the hosts ahead in the 76th minute of an eventual 3–1 home defeat of Sevilla FC. The following 29 June, he agreed to an extension until 2024.

Career statistics

Club

Honours
Real Sociedad
Copa del Rey: 2019–20

Spain U21
UEFA European Under-21 Championship: 2019

References

External links
Real Sociedad official profile

1997 births
Living people
People from Azkoitia
Sportspeople from Gipuzkoa
Spanish footballers
Footballers from the Basque Country (autonomous community)
Association football midfielders
La Liga players
Segunda División B players
Real Sociedad B footballers
Real Sociedad footballers
Spain youth international footballers
Spain under-21 international footballers